The Dark Tower: The Sorcerer is a one-shot comic book (one-issue limited series) published by Marvel Comics. It is the first non-sequential comic book limited series based on Stephen King's The Dark Tower series of novels. It is plotted and scripted by Robin Furth, with illustrations by Richard Isanove. Stephen King is the Creative and Executive Director of the project. The issue was published on April 15, 2009.

Unlike the previous three story arcs, which follow Roland Deschain and his ka-tet, The Sorcerer follows the life and motives of The Dark Tower villain Marten Broadcloak.

Publication dates
Issue #1: April 15, 2009

Related releases
The Dark Tower: Guide to Gilead

Collected editions
The single-issue release of The Sorcerer was included, along with the six-issue run of The Dark Tower: Fall of Gilead, in a collected hardcover edition also entitled The Dark Tower: Fall of Gilead and released by Marvel on February 23, 2010. A paperback edition was later released on November 2, 2011. The issue was also included in the hardcover release of The Dark Tower Omnibus on September 21, 2011. 

On September 25, 2018, Gallery 13 republished the original hardcover collection as Stephen King's The Dark Tower: Beginnings - The Fall of Gilead (Book 4).  On October 23, 2018, this edition (along with Books 1-3 and 5) was included in the boxed set Stephen King's The Dark Tower: Beginnings - The Complete Graphic Novel Series.

See also
The Dark Tower (comics)

References

External links

Dark Tower Official Site

2009 comics debuts
Sorcerer, The